The Governor of Ivano-Frankivsk Oblast is the head of executive branch for the Ivano-Frankivsk Oblast.

The office of Governor is an appointed position, with officeholders being appointed by the President of Ukraine, on recommendation from the Prime Minister of Ukraine.

The official residence for the Governor is located in Ivano-Frankivsk. President Volodymyr Zelenskyy appointed Svitlana Onyschuk as Governor on 8 July 2021.

Governors

Representative of the President
 1992 – 1994 Vasyl Pavlyk

Chairman of the Executive Committee
 1994 – 1995 Stepan Volkovetsky

Heads of the Administration
 1995 – 1997 Stepan Volkovetsky
 1997 – 2005 Mykhailo Vyshyvanyuk
 2005 – 2007 Roman Tkach
 2007 – 2010 Mykola Paliychuk
 2010 – 2013 Mykhailo Vyshyvanyuk

 2013 – 2014 Vasyl Chudnov
 2014 – 2014 Andriy Trotsenko
 2014 – 2019 Oleh Honcharuk
 2019 Maria Savka (Acting)
 2019 – 2020 Denys Shmyhal
 2020 Vitaliy Fedoriv
 2020 Maria Savka (Acting)
 2020 – 2021 Andriy Boychuk
 2021 – incumbent Svitlana Onyschuk

References

External links
Government of Ivano-Frankivsk Oblast in Ukrainian
Ivano-Frankivsk at the World Statesmen.org

 
Ivano-Frankivsk Oblast